Varvara Vasilyevna Panina (Варва′ра Васи′льевна Па′нина; 1872, Moscow, Russian Empire, - May 28, 1911, Moscow, Russian Empire) was a Russian singer of Romani origins, famous for her deep contralto, one of the Russian popular music stars of the early 20th century.

Biography
Varvara Vasilyeva (her birth name) was born to the family of Gypsy horse traders, based in Moscow. She started singing at the age of 14, first in the Gypsy choir directed by Alexandra Panina, at the Strelna restaurant. Having married Panina's nephew Fyodor Artemyevich Panin, she moved to the Moscow Yar restaurant, famous for its Gypsy concerts. In 1902 Varya Panina debuted on stage at the Saint Petersburg's Dvoryanskoye Sobranye (The Gentry Assembly) and had her first success. Since then she performed only on stage, giving solo concerts, performing Gypsy songs and Russian romances to rapturous response. Among her fans were poet Alexander Blok, writers Leo Tolstoy, Alexander Kuprin, Anton Chekhov, painter Konstantin Korovin and members of the Russian Royal family. Panina has made numerous recordings of which more than 50 remained. She died of a heart attack on May 28, 1911, and was buried at the Vagankovo cemetery.

References 

1872 births
1911 deaths
19th-century women singers from the Russian Empire
Singers from Moscow
Burials at Vagankovo Cemetery
Romani singers